Sergei Anashkin (12 April 1961 – 1 February 2022) was a Kazakhstani footballer who played as a defender.

Career
Anashkin began his career with Kolkozchi Ashkhabad, before spending several seasons with Daugava Rīga in the Soviet First League and finishing his career with FC Kairat.

He made four appearances for the Kazakhstan national team in 1992.

Personal life and death
Anashkin died on 1 February 2022, at the age of 60.

References

External links

1961 births
2022 deaths
Kazakhstani footballers
Association football defenders
Kazakhstan international footballers
Daugava Rīga players
FK Liepājas Metalurgs players
FC Ural Yekaterinburg players
FC Kairat players